The 2006–07 season saw Bournemouth compete in Football League One where they finished in 18th position with 52 points.

Final league table

Results
Bournemouth's score comes first

Legend

Football League One

FA Cup

Football League Cup

Football League Trophy

Squad statistics

References

External links
 Bournemouth 2006–07 at Soccerbase.com (select relevant season from dropdown list)

AFC Bournemouth seasons
AFC Bournemouth